Pui is a commune in Hunedoara County, Transylvania, Romania. It is composed of twelve villages: Băiești (Bajesd), Federi (Fégyér), Fizești (Füzesd), Galați (Galac), Hobița (Hobica), Ohaba-Ponor (Ohábaponor), Ponor (Ponor), Pui, Râu Bărbat (Borbátvíz), Rușor (Rusor), Șerel (Serél) and Uric (Urik).

Natives
 Marius Păcurar

References

Communes in Hunedoara County
Localities in Transylvania
Țara Hațegului